The Uniroyal International Championship was a professional golf tournament on the European Tour in 1976 and 1977. It was sponsored by rubber corporation Uniroyal, and hosted at Moor Park Golf Club near Rickmansworth, to the north of London, England.

In 1976 when it was called the Uniroyal International and won by  Englishman Tommy Horton, and the following year, once the word "Championship" had been added to the name, and Seve Ballesteros of Spain was the victor. The prize fund in the second year was £29,010, which was mid-range for a European Tour event at that time.

Winners

References

External links
Details on the European Tour's official site

Former European Tour events
Golf tournaments in England
Sport in Hertfordshire
Recurring sporting events established in 1976
Recurring sporting events disestablished in 1977
1976 establishments in England
1977 disestablishments in England